Ubet may refer to:

Ubet, Montana, a ghost town, United States
Ubet, Wisconsin, an unincorporated community, United States
Ubet (company), an Australian sports betting agency.